Raffaele Monaco La Valletta S.T.D. J.U.D. (23 February 1827 – 14 July 1896) was a Cardinal of the Roman Catholic Church who served as Secretary of the Supreme Sacred Congregation of the Holy Office.

Education
Raffaele Monaco La Valletta was born in L'Aquila and was of a family from Chieti. He was educated at the Collegio Romano where he earned a doctorate in theology. He continued his studies at the La Sapienza University, Rome, where he earned a doctorate utriusque iuris (in both canon and civil law). He ended his studies at the Pontifical Academy of Ecclesiastical Nobles in 1846.

Priesthood
He was ordained in 1849. He was created Protonotary apostolic supernumerary in 1858.  He worked as Pro-assessor for the Supreme Sacred Congregation of the Holy Office from 1859.

Cardinalate
He was created and proclaimed Cardinal-Priest of Santa Croce in Gerusalemme by Pope Pius IX in the consistory of 13 March 1868. He participated in the First Vatican Council from 1869-1870.

Episcopate
He was appointed titular archbishop of Eraclea on 9 January 1874 and consecrated by Pope Pius IX himself. He was appointed Vicar General of Rome by Pope Pius on 21 December 1876. He participated in the conclave of 1878 that elected Pope Leo XIII.

On 21 December 1878 he ordained Giacomo della Chiesa, who was to become Pope Benedict XV, and on 20 December 1879 he ordained Ambrogio Achille Ratti, who succeeded Benedict XV as Pope Pius XI.

He was appointed Camerlengo of the Sacred College of Cardinals by Pope Leo in 1880. He served as Major Penitentiary of the Apostolic Penitentiary, dispensing indulgences from 12 February 1884 until his death. He was also appointed to the office of Secretary of the Supreme Sacred Congregation of the Holy Office, guarding the orthodoxy of Church doctrine from 1884 until his death.

He was elected to the order of bishops and the suburbicarian see of Albano on 24 March 1884. He was elected to the suburbicarian see of Ostia on 24 May 1889 and thus became Dean of the Sacred College of Cardinals. He died in 1896 in Agerola.

References

1827 births
1896 deaths
Deans of the College of Cardinals
19th-century Italian cardinals
Cardinals created by Pope Pius IX
Cardinal-bishops of Albano
Cardinal Vicars
Members of the Holy Office
Major Penitentiaries of the Apostolic Penitentiary
Pontifical Ecclesiastical Academy alumni